Samantha A. Smith is an American actress.  She is known for her role as Mary Winchester on Supernatural.

Career
Smith began her career as a teenage model. She moved to Los Angeles and planned on doing commercials to support herself while she attended UCLA. She was in an HBO commercial that aired during the Super Bowl; this exposure led to her finding an agent and beginning her acting career.

Her most notable role is Mary Winchester on the paranormal and fantasy TV series Supernatural. She has also had guest appearances on Rizzoli & Isles, Friends and Criminal Minds. Her film work includes Jerry Maguire and Transformers.

Personal life
Smith is married and has a son.

Filmography

Film

Television

References

External links
 
 Winchester Bros Page

20th-century American actresses
21st-century American actresses
American film actresses
American television actresses
Living people
Actresses from Sacramento, California
Year of birth missing (living people)